The following is a list of Registered Historic Places in Macomb County, Michigan.



|}

See also

List of Michigan State Historic Sites in Macomb County, Michigan
 List of National Historic Landmarks in Michigan
 National Register of Historic Places listings in Michigan
 Listings in neighboring counties: Lapeer, Oakland, St. Clair, Wayne

References

Macomb County
Macomb County, Michigan
Tourist attractions in Metro Detroit
Buildings and structures in Macomb County, Michigan
National Register of Historic Places in Macomb County, Michigan